Cilician Campaign of Kayqubad the Great (1225), was a campaign of Sultan Kaykubad I of Rûm against the Armenian Kingdom of Cilicia. As a result of the campaign, the Armenians came under the Seljuk rule again.

Background
 
Rûm Sultan Kaykaus I, had subjugated the Armenian Kingdom Apart from this, the Armenian Kingdom was in conflict with the Principality of Antioch. After the death of the Armenian king Leo II in 1219, the king's daughter Isabelle married Philippe, the son of Prince Bohemund IV of Antioch. After this event, the Crusaders began to invade the Armenian country and Frankize the Armenians. But the Armenian aristocrats, with national enthusiasm, vehemently opposed this movement and condemned the prince as a hail. Thereupon, Prince of Antioch IV. Bohemund wanted to take action against the Armenians. But since he and his State were Christian, other Crusaders opposed him. In this case, Bohemund agreed with the Sultan of Rum, Ala-ud-din Kayqubad I, for a campaign against the Armenians. The Armenians also agreed with the ruler of Aleppo, Shihabeddin Tughrul. Thus, alliances were established between states.

In addition, Sultan Kayqubad wanted to ensure the security of the Anatolian-Syrian trade route. Because the Armenians were attacking the merchants in the Eastern Mediterranean. According to Ibn Bibî, a merchant came to the presence of the sultan and said: "I set out from Aleppo to come here. When I entered the land of Leo, fearless bandits took everything I had and everything I didn't have by force. My bright day turned into a dark night from the poverty I fell. If Christians are not afraid of this dervish lodge, in which sultan's lodge will I seek healing for the wound inflicted by this persecution." said.

Expedition
Sultan Kayqubad (he himself involved in this campaign) ordered the Governor of Antalya, Mubarizeddin Ertokuş, to advance from the coast and attack the Armenians and not to land the Cypriot Crusaders who were helping the Armenians. He also gave Emir Komnenos and Mubarizeddin Çavlı the task of attacking the Armenians from the ground.

Having received the order, Mubarizeddin Ertokus began to advance from the Antalya coast. The Franks, who came against him, could not stand the sword of the Turks, they were evacuating the castles and escaping to Cyprus by ships. Thus, Ertokus conquered about 40 castles such as Manavgat, Aydos, Anamur and Aydusanc.

The land attack of the Seljuks was more violent. Sultan Kayqubad and Mubarizeddin Çavlı entered the Armenian lands through the Taurus. Sultan Kayqubad the Great and Çavlı, who defeated the Armenians in the Battle of the Taurus Mountains, followed the Göksu Valley and began to descend towards Silifke.

Meanwhile, Baron Constantine, who separated the king's daughter Isabelle from Philippe and married her son Hetum and founded the Hetum (Hayton) Dynasty, sold some castles in the Mediterranean (including Silifke) to the Knights of the Templars and Hospices in order to attract the Crusaders to his side. Constantine's request for a Crusade was rejected, telling the Pope that Christianity was in danger. Sultan Kayqubad and Çavlı occupied the entire Göksu Valley and Silifke. Advancing from the eastern flank, Emir Komnenos recaptured the Çinçin Castle, which Sultan Kaykaus had taken.

The Armenian king asked Şihabeddin Tuğrul, Atabegi of Aleppo, for help, arguing that the Antakya Prinkepsi posed a danger to him. Şihabeddin Tuğrul stopped the advance of the Antakya Crusaders with his raids on Antioch. It is rumored that the Seljuks took 30 castles from the Armenians and Crusaders whom they squeezed from the coast in the west and from the land in the east.

Treaty
The Armenians, who saw that the Crusader aids did not help in the face of these great victories and conquests of the Seljuk forces, attempted to make a peace in line with the wishes of the Turks. The Sultan accepted the offer because the winter season was coming and it was suitable for his politics. According to the agreement reached:

1-The Armenian king will hand over many castles and towns to the Seljuks, and the king will recognize the Seljuk sultan more firmly than before. (Thus, the Armenians again bowed to the Seljuks.)

2-The king will send a contingent of 1000 cavalry and 500 mechanics to the Seljuks in case of need and expedition, together with his own weapons and equipment.

3-The tribute paid during the reign of Sultan Izzeddin Kaykaus will be doubled (ie to 40,000 dinar).

4-The coin will be minted in the name of Sultan Alaeddin Kayqubad and the sermon will read in his name.

See also
Kayqubad the Great
Sultanate of Rum
Armenian Kingdom of Cilicia
Crusaders
History of Turkey

References

Cilicia (1225)
Battles involving the Ayyubids
Battles involving Armenia